Vanlujaq (also Romanized asVānlūjaq and Vānlūjeq; also known as Dānlūjeq) is a village in Koshksaray Rural District, in the Central District of Marand County, East Azerbaijan Province, Iran. At the 2006 census, its population was 1,129, in 272 families.

References 

Populated places in Marand County